Ramiro Ezequiel Fergonzi (born 14 May 1989 in Buenos Aires, Argentina) is an Argentine professional footballer who plays as a forward for Indonesian club Persita Tangerang.

References
 
 

1989 births
Living people
Argentine footballers
Argentine expatriate footballers
Club Atlético Colegiales (Argentina) players
Unión San Felipe footballers
Deportivo Español footballers
Club Almirante Brown footballers
Flandria footballers
Club Atlético Mitre footballers
Patriotas Boyacá footballers
Club Atlético Zacatepec players
Bhayangkara F.C. players
Chacarita Juniors footballers
Alianza Atlético footballers
Persipura Jayapura players
Persita Tangerang players
Primera Nacional players
Primera B Metropolitana players
Chilean Primera División players
Categoría Primera A players
Liga 1 (Indonesia) players
Peruvian Primera División players
Association football forwards
Argentine expatriate sportspeople in Chile
Argentine expatriate sportspeople in Colombia
Argentine expatriate sportspeople in Mexico
Argentine expatriate sportspeople in Indonesia
Argentine expatriate sportspeople in Peru
Expatriate footballers in Chile
Expatriate footballers in Colombia
Expatriate footballers in Mexico
Expatriate footballers in Indonesia
Expatriate footballers in Peru
Footballers from Buenos Aires